In telecommunications, the term customer office terminal has the following meanings:

1. Termination equipment that (a) is located on the customer premises and (b) performs a function that may be integrated into the common carrier equipment.

Note:  An example of a customer office terminal is a stand-alone multiplexer located on the customer premises. 
2. The digital loop carrier (DLC) multiplexing function that is near the exchange termination (ET) when provided by a stand-alone multiplexer.

Note:  This function may be integrated into the ET.

References

Telecommunications equipment